The 1995 Baylor Bears football team (variously "Baylor", "BU", or the "Bears") represented Baylor University in the 1995 NCAA Division I-A football season. They were represented in the Southwest Conference. They played their home games at Floyd Casey Stadium in Waco, Texas. They were coached by head coach Chuck Reedy.

Schedule

Game summaries

Miami (FL)

References

Baylor
Baylor Bears football seasons
Baylor Bears football